The National Commission on Resources for Youth was an American program established in 1970. The Commission was charged with identifying and promoting youth participation in schools and communities across the United States, and was largely funded through the US Department of Health, Education and Welfare through their Office of Human Development and the Division of Youth Activities within the Office of Youth Development, with additional support from the Ford Foundation.

Activities
In addition to publications and studies on a range of youth participation topics, the Commission held meetings, training events and conferences across the country, with youth engagement in schools and community development seeing a significant increase. The Commission succeeded in seeding national movements in youth voice, youth participation, and community youth development. Aside from defining and fostering these efforts across the nation, the Commission provided expert knowledge and resources to support ongoing activities long after its closure.

The National Commission on Resources for Youth was preceded in federal legislation by the National Youth Administration, a 1930s federally coordinated youth program. Its recent political successor is the Tom Osborne Federal Youth Coordination Act, passed in 2006 to direct federal interaction among youth-serving agencies and grant programs. Several national organizations today trace their roots to the Commission, including the Forum for Youth Investment and Youth On Board.

The National Commission on Resources for Youth, Inc. was housed at 36 W. 44th Street, New York, NY, 10036. Mary C. Kohler served as the Director in 1970.

Publications by the Commission

 Conrad, D.E. (1982, May). Learning from the Field Experience: A Guide for Student Reflection in Youth Participation Programs. New York, NY: The National Commission on Resources for Youth.
 Conrad, D., with D. Harrington. (1981, May). Thinking about the Work Experience: A Manual for Learning and Reflection in Youth Employment Programs. New York, NY: The National Commission on Resources for Youth.
 National Commission on Resources for Youth. (n.d.). "Kids Can Do Wonderful Things." Resources for Youth Newsletter, VI(I). 
 National Commission on Resources for Youth. (1982, Fall). "These Young People Care!" Resources for Youth Newsletter, XI(I). 
 National Commission on Resources for Youth, United States (1974) 'New Roles for Youth in the School and the Community,' New York: Citation Press.
 National Commission on Resources for Youth. (1979). "What If..." Resources for Youth Newsletter, IX(II). 
 National Commission on Resources for Youth. (n.d.). 'Youth into Adult: Towards a Model for Programs that Facilitate the Transition to Adulthood.' New York, NY: National Commission on Resources for Youth. 
 National Commission on Resources for Youth. (1970). You're the Tutor. New York, NY: National Commission on Resources for Youth.
 National Commission on Resources for Youth. (1970). For the Tutor. New York, NY: National Commission on Resources for Youth.
 National Commission on Resources for Youth. (1970). Tutoring Tricks and Tips. New York, NY: National Commission on Resources for Youth.
 National Commission on Resources for Youth. (1975, December). Youth Participation: A Concept Paper. A Report of the National Commission on Resources for Youth to the Department of Health, Education and Welfare, Office of Youth Development. New York, NY: National Commission on Resources for Youth. 
 Schine, J., with B. Shoup & D. Harrington. (1981). New Roles for Early Adolescents. New York, NY: The National Commission on Resources for Youth.

References

External links 
 Tom Osborne Federal Youth Coordination Act
 National Youth Development Information Center Federal Youth Coordination Act Information Center
 Rep. Tom Osborne's (NE03) Press Release on the Federal Youth Coordination Act

History of youth
United States national commissions
Youth in the United States
1970 establishments in the United States